William "Webby" Neill (1884–1964) was a pioneer Australian rugby league footballer who played in the 1900s and 1910s, who later became a leading referee in the New South Wales Rugby Football League.

Playing career
Neill played for South Sydney in the first ever NSWRFL premiership season in 1908 and that year went on to play in the first ever Grand final, which his team won. The following season Souths also won the premiership and he was first selected for the Australian national side that year. Neill moved to Newtown the following season, playing in their 1910 NSWRFL season grand final-winning team to make it three premierships in three years. The following year he was selected to go on the 1911–12 Kangaroo tour of Great Britain, the second-ever. He played for another three seasons at Newtown before a final season with Glebe.

Post playing
Neill later took to refereeing in the NSWRFL. He oversaw matches in  a long refereeing career from 1916 to 1932 and officiated in a number of Grand finals in that time.

He was awarded Life Membership of the New South Wales Rugby League in 1931.

Neill is listed on the Australian Players Register as Kangaroo No. 50

References

External links
William Neill at nrlstats.com

1884 births
1964 deaths
Australasia rugby league team players
Australia national rugby league team players
Australian rugby league players
Australian rugby league referees
Glebe rugby league players
New South Wales rugby league team players
Newtown Jets players
Rugby league fullbacks
Rugby league players from Sydney
South Sydney Rabbitohs players